Power Rangers Ninja Storm is a side scrolling fighting game, based on the Power Rangers Ninja Storm TV show. The game uses passwords to track progress.

Gameplay
All six Ninja Storm Rangers are playable, each with their own abilities. The Red Wind Ranger's special attack is Hawk Blaster, Blue Wind Ranger's special attack is Sonic Fin, Yellow Wind Ranger's special attack is Lion Hammer, Crimson Thunder Ranger's special attack is Crimson Blaster, Navy Thunder Ranger's special attack is Navy Antler and finally the Green Samurai Ranger's special attack is Shuriken Spin.

The player selects one of the six rangers, which affects the play level. Minor enemies appear first followed by the main boss for the level. After defeating the boss, he grows to giant size, and the player takes control of one of three Megazords (determined by the ranger selected: Red, Blue, or Yellow Ranger uses the Storm Megazord; Crimson or Navy Ranger the Thunder Megazord; and Green Ranger uses Samurai Star Megazord). Megazord levels feature quick time events where the player must press the correct button shown onscreen to launch successful attacks against the opponent.

Reception
The Game Boy Advance version has a score of 50 percent on GameRankings, based on nine reviews.  According to Metacritic, the Game Boy Advance version of the game received “mixed or average reviews.”

References

2003 video games
Game Boy Advance games
THQ games
Natsume (company) games
Video games about ninja
Power Rangers video games
Power Rangers Ninja Storm
Video games featuring female protagonists
Windows games
Superhero video games
Artech Studios games
Single-player video games